Marriage 2.0 (also known as Marriage 2.0: A Modern Love Story) is a 2015 adult romance film depicting the first steps of a married couple into a non-monogamous open relationship. It was written and produced by Magnus Sullivan and directed  by Paul Deeb. 

Although the original version contains explicit sex scenes, the edited version received an NC-17 rating by the Motion Picture Association of America (MPAA). Author Christopher Ryan and sexologists Emily Morse, Reid Mihalko and Carol Queen appear in the film in brief cameos.

Cast
India Summer as India  
 Ryan Driller as Eric
Nina Hartley as India's Mother
Dylan Ryan as  Kara 
Sadie Lune as Meghan

Release
Marriage 2.0 had its public theatrical premiere on May 2, 2015. On May 19, 2015 it was screened at the University of California, Santa Barbara as part of their Film and Media Studies course.

Reception
British writer Gareth May, in an article for the British lifestyle and culture site TheDebrief, described the film as "a potential game changer for the porn industry." Salon's writer Tracy Clark-Flory wrote "it’s a far more attractive and better-acted porn film than most. But it’s the focus on incorporating the explicit sex scenes into a well-developed narrative that really makes it stand out." The un-rated version of the film received the Best Narrative award at New York's 2015 CineKink Film Festival, and was awarded Movie of the Year at the 2015 Feminist Porn Awards.

References

External links

2010s romance films
2010s English-language films
2015 films
2010s pornographic films
Films about sexuality
Adultery in films